Libramont is a major railway station in Libramont-Chevigny, Luxembourg, Belgium. It opened on 8 November 1858 on 162 - 163 - 165. The train services are operated by NMBS/SNCB.

 the electric-powered MS08 replaced the MW41 DMU's. The comfort is much better now, they drive on almost every local service around Libramont.

Train services
The station is served by the following services:

Intercity services (IC-16) Brussels - Namur - Arlon - Luxembourg
Local services (L-10) Ciney - Marloie - Libramont
Local services (L-11) Namur - Dinant - Bertrix - Libramont
Local services (L-12) Libramont - Arlon - Luxembourg
Local services (L-13) Libramont - Virton - Athus - Arlon (weekdays)
Local services (L-13) Libramont - Virton (weekends)

References

Railway stations in Belgium
Railway stations in Luxembourg (Belgium)
Railway stations opened in 1858
Libramont-Chevigny